Luis Miguel Carrión Delgado (born 7 February 1979) is a Spanish former professional footballer who played as a right-back, currently manager of FC Cartagena.

Playing career
Born in Barcelona, Catalonia, Carrión began his senior career in the C and B teams of FC Barcelona. He made 24 total Segunda División appearances for the latter and Gimnàstic de Tarragona, and played 262 matches in Segunda División B for those clubs and five others.

Coaching career
In June 2011, Carrión was appointed manager of the women's team of RCD Espanyol in his hometown. He left two years later, having won the Copa de la Reina de Fútbol in 2012.

Carrión then returned to the men's game and became assistant to Pablo Villa at Córdoba CF in the second tier. In February 2014, he was made interim when the latter was dismissed, and on the 16th he was on the bench as the side lost 3–0 at CD Numancia.

In March 2015, Carrión was named coach of Córdoba's reserves in division three. Having suffered relegation to Tercera División and bounced back with promotion, he was then given the job at the first team on 29 November 2016, replacing José Luis Oltra at a side 16th in the standings. The following 16 October, he was himself relieved of his duties.

In June 2018, Carrión was hired at third-tier UD Melilla, whom he had played for a decade earlier. He took the team from the North African exclave to the playoffs, where they were eliminated by a single goal from CD Atlético Baleares in the semi-finals.

Carrión moved up a league in the summer of 2019, agreeing to a deal at Numancia. He left the club after their relegation in July 2020, and was appointed at fellow second division side FC Cartagena on 12 January 2021.

Managerial statistics

Honours
Espanyol Feminino
Copa de la Reina de Fútbol: 2012

References

External links

1979 births
Living people
Spanish footballers
Footballers from Barcelona
Association football defenders
Segunda División players
Segunda División B players
Tercera División players
CF Damm players
FC Barcelona C players
FC Barcelona Atlètic players
CF Gavà players
Gimnàstic de Tarragona footballers
Córdoba CF players
Terrassa FC footballers
UD Melilla footballers
Deportivo Alavés players
Spain youth international footballers
Spanish football managers
Segunda División managers
Segunda División B managers
Tercera División managers
Córdoba CF managers
UD Melilla managers
CD Numancia managers
FC Cartagena managers
Primera División (women) managers
RCD Espanyol non-playing staff
Córdoba CF B managers